Football Club Cwmaman are a Welsh football team based in the village of Cwmaman near Aberdare. They play in the South Wales Alliance League, Premier Division. They formerly played in the Welsh Football League during a period when the club were known as Cwmaman Institute.

History
The club were founded in 1965 as Ivy Bush, winning the Aberdare Valley League in 1968–69, before changing the name of the club to FC Cwmaman in 1976. Following the change of name. the club saw a period of success with three successive seasons where they finished champions of the league.  They applied to join the South Wales Amateur League on a number of occasions and were turned down, before in 1983 they were admitted to the league. In 2000 the club changed its name to Cwmaman Institute. After a number of seasons where the club finished at the top part of the table, in 2006–07, they were champions of Division One, gaining promotion to the Welsh Football League. At the end of the 2010–11 season they finished as runners-up in Division Two, gaining promotion to Division One. In 2011 they received an undisclosed percentage of the proceeds from the Stereophonics pre-Christmas gigs.

The club then had three successive seasons when they were relegated, finishing 14th (of 16 teams) in their only season in Division One, followed by finishing bottom of Division Two the following season and second from bottom of the Division Three, and hence left the Weish League.  The club joined the South Wales Senior League in Division One for a singular season before moving to the newly formed South Wales Alliance League in Division One for the 2015–16 season.  The club then changed its name back to being called FC Cwmaman

The club were promoted to the Premier Division at the end of the 2019–19 season after a third-place finish in Division One.

Honours

Welsh Football League Division Two – Runners-up: 2010–11
South Wales Amateur League Division One – Champions: 2006–07
Aberdare Valley League – Champions: 1968–69
 Aberdare Valley Football League Jubilee Cup Winners 2021-2022

References

External links
 Official twitter for FC Cwmaman
 Archived website of Cwmaman Institute F.C.

Football clubs in Wales
1965 establishments in Wales
Welsh Football League clubs
South Wales Alliance League clubs
South Wales Amateur League clubs
South Wales Senior League clubs